The 2016 Handball League Australia was the first round robin handball league in Australia. The principal idea was to play round robin games in each capital city. There are four teams representing four states.

The inaugural competition was won by current Australian and Oceania champions Sydney University Handball Club.

Calendar

Franchises

Results

Table

Round 1 – Geelong (Victoria)

Round 2 – Canberra (ACT)

Round 3 – Brisbane (QLD)
Cancelled

Round 4 – Sydney (NSW)

Top goalscorers

References

External links
 Official webpage
 Handball Australia webpage
 Competition details on Handball Australia webpage
 NSW CLUBS TO COMPETE IN AUSTRALIAN CHAMPIONSHIPS. NSWHF webpage. 31 May 2016.
 Geelong ready to host Australian club championships. Handball Australia. 1 June 2016.
 Sydney University aiming to defend title. 2 June 2016.
 Draw on Handball Victoria Webpage
 Day three report. Handball Australia. 4 June 2016. 

Handball League Australia
Australian Handball League
Australian Handball League
Handball League